Lile, the piquitingas, is a genus of small fish belonging to the herring family, Clupeidae.  They are endemic to the Americas.  There are currently four recognized species in the genus.

Species
 Lile gracilis Castro-Aguirre & Vivero, 1990 (Graceful piquitinga)
 Lile nigrofasciata Castro-Aguirre, Ruiz-Campos & Balart, 2002 (Blackstripe herring)
 Lile piquitinga (Schreiner & A. Miranda-Ribeiro, 1903) (Atlantic piquitinga)
 Lile stolifera (D. S. Jordan & C. H. Gilbert, 1882) (Pacific piquitinga)

References
 

Clupeidae
Taxa named by David Starr Jordan
Taxa named by Barton Warren Evermann
Marine fish genera